Electrophorus varii is a species of electric eel found in South America.

Taxonomy 
It was previously classified within Electrophorus electricus when that species was considered the only one in the genus Electrophorus, but a 2019 analysis described it and E. voltai as distinct species based on both their deep genetic divergences and differences in the voltage produced by each species. It is also thought to be the most basal member of the three Electrophorus species, diverging during the late Miocene. It is named in honor of American ichthyologist Richard Peter Vari.

Distribution 
It is found throughout the lowland habitats of the Amazon Basin and in some streams in the Guiana Shield, in contrast to the other two species in the genus, which are adapted to only upland shield habitats. It inhabits turbid rivers with little oxygen and sandy or muddy bottoms.

Description 
This species closely resembles E. electricus, but lacks the clear band along the body that is usually present in E. electricus. This species produces the second-highest maximum voltage of the three Electrophorus species, at about 572 volts.

References 

Gymnotidae
Electrophoridae
Strongly electric fish
Freshwater fish of Brazil
Fish of French Guiana
Freshwater fish of Ecuador
Freshwater fish of Peru
Freshwater fish of Colombia
Taxa named by Carlos David Canabarro Machado de Santana
Taxa named by Wolmar B. Wosiacki
Taxa named by William Gareth Richard Crampton
Taxa named by Mark Henry Sabaj Pérez
Taxa named by Casey B. Dillman
Taxa named by Raimundo N. Mendes-Júnior
Taxa named by Natália Castro e Castro
Fish described in 2019